Mahendra Bishnoi (born 5 October 1981) is an Indian politician. He is a member of the Rajasthan Legislative Assembly. He is a member of the Indian national congress and represents the Luni in Rajasthan Legislative Assembly Jodhpur District Rajasthan.

Personal life 

Mahendra Bishnoi is the grandson of Marwar's veteran leader Ram Singh Bishnoi and son of former Luni MLA Malkhan Singh Bishnoi. He hails from a political family.

Political life 
Mahendra has carried on the family's legacy by winning from the Luni assembly seat. In 2018, he contested for the first time and won the election.

See also
 Ram Singh Bishnoi
 Malkhan Singh Bishnoi
 Political families of Rajasthan
 Luni (Rajasthan Assembly constituency)

References 

Living people
1981 births
Indian National Congress politicians from Rajasthan
Rajasthan MLAs 2018–2023
People from Jodhpur